The Commonwealth Works Site is an historic industrial archaeological site in Norwich, Connecticut.  Located near the Yantic Falls on the Yantic River, it was the site of a major industrial facility developed in the mid-19th century, with an industrial history dating back to the 18th century.  Charles Augustus Converse had consolidated water rights at the falls, and built a large complex which housed a number of different water-powered enterprises, including the gun factory of Ethan Allen, a gristmill, sawmill, woolen mill, nail factory, and a cork-cutting factory.

The site was listed on the National Register of Historic Places in 1998.

See also
National Register of Historic Places listings in New London County, Connecticut

References

Archaeological sites on the National Register of Historic Places in Connecticut
National Register of Historic Places in New London County, Connecticut
Norwich, Connecticut